Shijing Town  is a township-level division of Nan'an City, in southern Fujian Province, China.

Geography

Shijing Town is located on the western shore of the narrow Anhai Bay (the estuary of the Shijing River), where it opens into the Weitou Bay 
of the Taiwan Strait.

Administratively, the territory included into Shijing Town forms sort of a southern "panhandle" of Nan'an City, and the only part of Nan'an that is located on the sea coast.

Shijing is served by Fujian Provincial Highway 201 (S201), which runs generally parallel to the sea coast.

Administrative divisions
One residential community:
 Shijing (Shih-ching)

Twenty-five villages:
 Sunei, Xiafang, Lianfeng, Yuanxia (Yüan-hsia), Cujin, Houdian (Hou-tien), Sanxiang, Linbing, Yingqian, Tiandong, Xianjing, Laogang, Qiaotou, Hemei, Kuixia, Xiban, Gushan (Ku-shan), Guoqian (Kuo-ch'ien), Yangshan, Yuanqian (Yüan-ch'ien), Cendou / Yindou ( / ), Xidong (Ch'i-tung), Jujiang ( / ), Qianban, Xifu

Economy
As the name (Shijing 石井 = "Stone Well") indicates, Shijing, along with the nearby Shuitou, is a major center of stoneworking.

Shijing is also a sea port of regional importance (administratively, one of the port areas of the Port of Quanzhou), involved in the cross-strait trade with Taiwan. Shijing also has the mainland terminal of the so-called "Quan-Jin Ferry" (short for "Quanzhou-Kinmen Ferry"), the 
regular passenger ferry service to the nearby Kinmen (Quemoy, Jinmen) Island, held by the Taiwan-based Republic of China. As of February 2012, this ferry (unlike similar ferries from Xiamen) may only be taken by the PRC and ROC citizens, and not by third-country nationals.

See also

List of township-level divisions of Fujian

References

Township-level divisions of Fujian